The Children Thief is a 1991 French drama film directed by Christian de Chalonge.

Cast
 Marcello Mastroianni - Bigua
 Ángela Molina - Desposoria
 Michel Piccoli - M. Armand
 Nada Strancar - Rose
 Cécile Pallas - Mère d'Antoine
 Virginie Ledoyen - Gabrielle
 Loïc Even - Joseph
 Caspar Salmon - Antoine
 Benjamin Doat - Benjamin
 Nicolas Carré - Nicolas
 Adrien Canivet - René
 Mathieu Bisson - Simon
 Nathanaël De Vries - Enfant melo
 Daniel Martin
 Gabriele Tinti - L'Argentin

References

External links

1991 films
French drama films
1990s French-language films
1991 drama films
Films directed by Christian de Chalonge
1990s French films